Canby is a census-designated place in Modoc County, California. Its population is 183 as of the 2020 census, down from 315 from the 2010 census. The ZIP Code is 96015. The community is inside area code 530.

Canby is the location of the main branch of the I'SOT religious community, and is known for the I'SOT's nativity scenes prominently displayed along the town's main street, California State Route 299.

History
The first post office opened at Canby in 1874. The town was named in honor of General Edward Canby, who was shot by the Modoc tribal leader Captain Jack at a peacemaking session as part of the Modoc War.  This shooting lead to the siege at Captain Jack's Stronghold.

Until the late 1940s, Canby was the site of Big Lakes Box Company and the supply point for Big Lakes Logging Camp in the Adin Mountains about 10 miles to the southeast, where conditions were primitive.

California Historical Landmarks:
About  9.3 mi northwest of Canby is a California Historical Landmark number #111 about the Old Emigrant Trail.

California Historical Landmark number 111 reads:
NO. 111 OLD EMIGRANT TRAIL - Near the present Pit River-Happy Camp Road this old pioneer trail, part of one of the earliest roads in northeastern California, is yet easily traced. Trees eight to ten inches in diameter are growing in the old road bed.

About 5 miles southeast of Canby is California Historical Landmark number 125.

California Historical Landmark number 125 reads:
NO. 125 EVANS AND BAILEY FIGHT-1861 - S. D. Evans, Sr. and Joe Bailey, stockmen from Rogue River Valley, Oregon, and 16 of their employees were driving 900 head of beef cattle from Roseburg to the mines at Virginia City, Nevada when they were attacked by Indians and the two owners killed.

Geography
According to the United States Census Bureau, the CDP covers an area of 2.3 square miles (6.0 km), 98.21% of it land, and 1.79% of it water.

Climate
This region experiences hot and dry summers, with no average monthly temperatures above 71.6 °F.  According to the Köppen Climate Classification system, Canby has a warm-summer Mediterranean climate, abbreviated "Csb" on climate maps.

Demographics

The 2010 United States Census reported that Canby had a population of 315. The racial makeup of Canby was 292 (92.7%) White, 2 (0.6%) African American, 7 (2.2%) Native American, 1 (0.3%) Asian, 0 (0.0%) Pacific Islander, 9 (2.9%) from other races, and 4 (1.3%) from two or more races. Hispanic or Latino of any race were 24 persons (7.6%).

The Census reported that 154 people (48.9% of the population) lived in households, 133 (42.2%) lived in non-institutionalized group quarters, and 28 (8.9%) were institutionalized.

There were 62 households, out of which 15 (24.2%) had children under the age of 18 living in them, 30 (48.4%) were opposite-sex married couples living together, 7 (11.3%) had a female householder with no husband present, 3 (4.8%) had a male householder with no wife present.  There were 5 (8.1%) unmarried opposite-sex partnerships, and 0 (0%) same-sex married couples or partnerships. 15 households (24.2%) were made up of individuals, and 8 (12.9%) had someone living alone who was 65 years of age or older. The average household size was 2.48.  There were 40 families (64.5% of all households); the average family size was 2.58.

The population was spread out, with 87 people (27.6%) under the age of 18, 27 people (8.6%) aged 18 to 24, 71 people (22.5%) aged 25 to 44, 80 people (25.4%) aged 45 to 64, and 50 people (15.9%) who were 65 years of age or older.  The median age was 36.2 years. For every 100 females, there were 85.3 males.  For every 100 females age 18 and over, there were 83.9 males.

The homeowner vacancy rate was 2.9%; the rental vacancy rate was 12.5%.  73 people (23.2% of the population) lived in owner-occupied housing units and 81 people (25.7%) lived in rental housing units.

Politics

See also
California Historical Landmarks in Modoc County

References

Census-designated places in Modoc County, California
Census-designated places in California